The men's 400 metre individual medley competition of the swimming events at the 2011 Pan American Games took place on the 15 of October at the Scotiabank Aquatics Center. The defending Pan American Games champion is Thiago Pereira of Brazil.

This race consisted of eight lengths of the pool. The first two lengths were swum using the butterfly stroke, the second pair with the backstroke, the third pair of lengths in breaststroke, and the final two were freestyle.

Records 
Prior to this competition, the existing world and Pan American Games records were as follows:

Qualification 
Each National Olympic Committee (NOC) was able to enter up to two entrants providing they had met the A standard (4:34.2) in the qualifying period (January 1, 2010 to September 4, 2011). NOCs were also permitted to enter one athlete providing they had met the B standard (4:41.5) in the same qualifying period.

Results 
All times shown are in minutes.

Heats 
The first round was held on October 15.

B Final 
The B final was also held on October 15.

A Final 
The A final was held on October 15.

References 

Swimming at the 2011 Pan American Games